Trading Change is the debut studio album by South African singer-songwriter Jeremy Loops. It received positive reviews from critics and debuted at no. 1 in South Africa.

Track listing

Charts

References 

2014 debut albums
Jeremy Loops albums